Cerulean, also spelled caerulean, is a shade of blue ranging between azure and a darker sky blue.

The first recorded use of cerulean as a colour name in English was in 1590. The word is derived from the Latin word caeruleus, "dark blue, blue, or blue-green", which in turn probably derives from caerulum, diminutive of caelum, "heaven, sky".

"Cerulean blue" is the name of a pigment. The pigment was discovered in the late eighteenth century and designated as cerulean blue in the nineteenth century.

Cerulean blue pigment
The primary chemical constituent of the pigment is cobalt(II) stannate. The precise hue of the pigment is dependent on a variable silicate component.

The pigment Cerulean blue was discovered in 1789 by the Swiss chemist Albrecht Höpfner. Subsequently, there was a limited German production under the name of Cölinblau. It was in 1860 first marketed in the United Kingdom by colourman George Rowney, as "coeruleum". Other nineteenth century English pigment names included "ceruleum blue" and "corruleum blue".

When the cerulean blue pigment (see the adjacent colour box) was discovered, it became a useful addition to Prussian blue, cobalt blue, and synthetic ultramarine, which already had superseded the prior blue and blue‑ish pigments. The pigment is very expensive.

Pigments through the ages shows a "Painted swatch of cerulean blue" to represent the actual cobalt stannate pigment. See also painted swatch and crystals of cerulean blue at ColourLex.

It is particularly valuable for artistic painting of skies because of its hue, its permanence, and its opaqueness. Berthe Morisot painted the blue coat of the woman in her Summer's Day, 1879 in cerulean blue in conjunction with artificial ultramarine and cobalt blue.

Today, cobalt chromate is sometimes marketed under the cerulean blue name but is darker and greener than the cobalt stannate version. The chromate makes excellent turquoise colours and is identified by Rex Art and some other manufacturers as "cobalt turquoise".

Other colour variations

Pale cerulean

Pantone, in a press release, declared the pale hue of cerulean at right, which they call cerulean, as the "colour of the millennium".

The source of this colour is the "Pantone Textile Paper eXtended (TPX)" colour list, colour #15-4020 TPX—Cerulean.

Cerulean (Crayola) 

This bright tone of cerulean is the colour called cerulean by Crayola crayons.

Cerulean frost

At right is displayed the colour cerulean frost.

Cerulean frost is one of the colours in the special set of metallic coloured Crayola crayons called Silver Swirls, the colours of which were formulated by Crayola in 1990.

Curious Blue

Curious Blue is one of the bright tone colors of cerulean

In nature
 Cerulean cuckooshrike
 Cerulean kingfisher
 Cerulean flycatcher
 Cerulean warbler
 Cerulean-capped manakin

See also
 The Devil Wears Prada (film) § Cerulean sweater speech
 Pusher (The X-Files episode) § "Cerulean blue is a gentle breeze"
 List of colors
 Pigment
 Blue pigments

Explanatory notes

References

External links
A page on Cerulean Blue
Cerulean blue at ColourLex

Quaternary colors
Pigments
Inorganic pigments
Shades of azure
Shades of blue
Shades of cyan
Bird colours
Cobalt compounds